The Buena Vista Valley is an approximately  long valley located in central-east Pershing County, Nevada. Unionville, Nevada lies at its northwest, at the foothills of the Humboldt Range.

Description
The Buena Vista Valley is an approximately north–south trending valley, and crescent shaped narrowing both due-north in its north end, and due-southwest in the south. The narrowing in the north is from the perimeter ranges of the Humboldt Range, west and the East Range, east. The valley is at its widest at the north end of the Buena Vista Lake Bed, about 13-mi.

The southwest is a region connected to the northwest of the Carson Sink. The narrowing of the valley southwestwards is caused by the Stillwater Range, its north section which turns to trend due-northeast. The low elevation Buena Vista Hills, and Chocolate Butte, lie between the Carson Sink and the southwest Buena Vista  Valley. This hilly region is located in a sub-valley region, named "Antelope Valley".

Access
The south of Buena Vista Valley can be accessed from the west via Interstate 80, north of Lovelock, via Coal Canyon Road; the road is paved to the valley's south end.

The valley's north has Nevada State Route 400 traversing due-south from Mill City on I-80 to Unionville at the west foothills of the Humboldt Range. Numerous unimproved roads extend through all areas of the valley.

References

External links
Buena Vista Valley (Playa), lat-long.com (coordinates, elev. 4065 ft)

Valleys of Pershing County, Nevada